Three ships of the United States Navy have been named Dauntless.

 , was a side-wheel steamer renamed USS Mignonette after her transfer to the Union Navy 30 September 1862.
 , was a motor patrol boat used during World War I.
 , was a yacht originally called Delphine, built by Horace Dodge, co-founder of Dodge Brothers, for his personal use and later used by the Navy during World War II.

Fictional ships
It is also the name of a fictional starship in the Star Trek universe.
 USS Dauntless (NX-01-A)

United States Navy ship names